Lucius W. Briggs (1866-1940) was an American architect practicing in Worcester, Massachusetts.

Life and career
Lucius Wallace Briggs was born August 26, 1866 in Worcester to Cornelius W. and Lucy R. (Wallace) Briggs. His father was a mechanical engineer. He attended the public schools and graduated from Worcester Classical High School. He attended a special course in architecture at the Massachusetts Institute of Technology in Boston before coming home to Worcester. He worked as a draftsman for the architecture firms of Barker & Nourse and Fuller & Delano, and the large contracting firm of Norcross Brothers. In 1896 he left the firm of Fuller, Delano & Frost and opened his own office.

In 1899 he joined architects Howard Frost and C. Leslie Chamberlain in the new firm of Frost, Briggs & Chamberlain. The new firm quickly outpaced Worcester's other architects and became the city's most prominent architects. This firm was, among other projects, responsible for the design of such landmarks as the Slater Building and the former Worcester Technical High School. However, in 1912, after thirteen years, the partnership was dissolved. Frost & Chamberlain continued their practice, and Briggs incorporated the L. W. Briggs Company. He continued in his former success, and at the time of his death was thought to be Worcester's best known architect. Briggs' death occurred in Worcester, September 10, 1940.

After his death the L. W. Briggs Company was continued by his son, Stuart Wallace Briggs. The younger Briggs was a graduate of the Worcester Polytechnic Institute and had been associated with his father's business since 1920. In 1949 he changed the firm's name to L. W. Briggs Associates, which practiced through the 1960s.

Briggs joined the American Institute of Architects in 1902, and was president of the Worcester chapter for some twenty years. He was also a long time member of the Worcester Planning Board.

Personal life
Briggs married Lillian Fraser Vickers of Portland, Maine in 1889. They had four children together. Stuart Wallace, who would be associated with his father, was the youngest.

In addition to his professional associations, Briggs was also a member of several social and historical organizations.

Works

L. W. Briggs Company, 1912-1949
 1912 - Greendale Branch Library, 470 West Boylston St, Worcester, Massachusetts
 Now the Frances Perkins Branch Library.
 1913 - Clubhouse, Worcester Country Club, 2 Rice St, Worcester, Massachusetts
 1913 - Mrs. Irving H. Verry House, 4 Military Rd, Worcester, Massachusetts
 An Italian Renaissance-style house, published in House Beautiful in 1917.
 1916 - Worcester Technical High School (additions), 34 Grove St, Worcester, Massachusetts
 A major expansion.
 1920 - Crompton & Knowles Warehouse, 21 Illinois St, Worcester, Massachusetts
 1925 - Worcester Fire Alarm Station, 230 Park Ave, Worcester, Massachusetts
 1926 - Katz and Leavitt Apartment House, 53 Elm St, Worcester, Massachusetts
 1928 - Center School, 11 Ash St, Hopkinton, Massachusetts
 1930 - South High School Annex, 14 Richards St, Worcester, Massachusetts
 1931 - Worcester Memorial Auditorium, 1 Lincoln Sq, Worcester, Massachusetts
 With Frederic C. Hirons of New York.
 1935 - Auburn High School, 99 Auburn St, Auburn, Massachusetts
 Demolished.
 1939 - Leicester Town Hall, 3 Washburn Sq, Leicester, Massachusetts

L. W. Briggs Associates, from 1949
 1950 - Center School Addition, 11 Ash St, Hopkinton, Massachusetts
 1954 - Hopkinton High School (former), 88 Hayden Rowe St, Hopkinton, Massachusetts
 1954 - Wachusett Regional High School, Main St, Holden, Massachusetts
 1954 - Worcester County Courthouse Annex, 2 Main St, Worcester, Massachusetts
 In association with Cornelius W. Buckley.
 1956 - Narragansett Regional High School, 464 Baldwinville Rd, Templeton, Massachusetts
 1957 - Pearl-Elm Parking Garage, 20 Pearl St, Worcester, Massachusetts
 On the site of the original Worcester Public Library.
 1957 - Shrewsbury High School (former), Oak St, Shrewsbury, Massachusetts
 1958 - Worcester Mutual Fire Insurance Company Building, 49 Elm St, Worcester, Massachusetts
 1959 - Burncoat High School, 179 Burncoat St, Worcester, Massachusetts
 1963 - Leominster High School, 122 Granite St, Leominster, Massachusetts

References

1940 deaths
Architects from Worcester, Massachusetts
1866 births